"Brachyzancla" sporima is a species of moth. It was described by Turner in 1947. It is found in Australia, where it has been recorded from Queensland.

The forewings are whitish-ochreous sparsely irrorated, especially towards margins, with large blackish scales. There is a small basal blackish fascia, as well as moderate blackish discal spots at one-fourth and the middle. The hindwings are grey-whitish.

Taxonomy
The species was described in the genus Brachyzancla, now considered a synonym of Ardozyga. The species does not belong in this genus however, and is thought to belong to the Xyloryctinae.

References

Ardozyga
Moths described in 1947
Moths of Australia